Jon Lech Johansen (born November 18, 1983 in Harstad, Norway), also known as DVD Jon, is a Norwegian programmer who has worked on reverse engineering data formats. He wrote the DeCSS software, which decodes the Content Scramble System used for DVD licensing enforcement. Johansen is a self-trained software engineer, who quit high school during his first year to spend more time with the DeCSS case. He moved to the United States and worked as a software engineer from October 2005 until November 2006.  He then moved to Norway but moved back to the United States in June 2007.

Education
In a post on his blog, he said that in the 1990s he started with a book (Programming the 8086/8088), the web ("Fravia's site was a goldmine") and IRC ("Lurked in a x86 assembly IRC channel and picked up tips from wise wizards.")

DeCSS prosecution 
After Johansen released DeCSS, he was taken to court in Norway for computer hacking in 2002. The prosecution was conducted by the Norwegian National Authority for the Investigation and Prosecution of Economic and Environmental Crime (Økokrim in Norwegian), after a complaint by the US DVD Copy Control Association (DVD-CCA) and the Motion Picture Association (MPA).  Johansen has denied writing the decryption code in DeCSS, saying that this part of the project originated from someone in Germany. He only developed the GUI component of the software. His defense was assisted by the Electronic Frontier Foundation. The trial opened in the Oslo District Court on 9 December 2002 with Johansen pleading not guilty to charges that had a maximum penalty of two years in prison or large fines. The defense argued that no illegal access was obtained to anyone else's information, since Johansen owned the DVDs himself. They also argued that it is legal under Norwegian law to make copies of such data for personal use. The verdict was announced on 7 January 2003, acquitting Johansen of all charges.

Two further levels of appeals were available to the prosecutors, to the appeals court and then to the Supreme Court. Økokrim filed an appeal on 20 January 2003 and it was reported on 28 February that the Borgarting Court of Appeal had agreed to hear the case. Johansen's second DeCSS trial began in Oslo on 2 December 2003, and resulted in an acquittal on 22 December 2003. Økokrim announced on 5 January 2004 that it would not appeal the case to the Supreme Court.

Other projects

In the first decade of the 21st century, Johansen's career has included many other projects.

2001
In 2001, Johansen released OpenJaz, a reverse-engineered set of drivers for Linux, BeOS and Windows 2000 that allow operation of the JazPiper MP3 digital audio player without its proprietary drivers.

2003
In November 2003, Johansen released QTFairUse, an open source program which dumps the raw output of a QuickTime Advanced Audio Coding (AAC) stream to a file, which could bypass the Digital Rights Management (DRM) software used to encrypt content of music from media such as those distributed by the iTunes Music Store, Apple Computer's online music store. Although these resulting raw AAC files were unplayable by most media players at the time of release, they represent the first attempt at circumventing Apple's encryption.

2004
Johansen had by now become a VideoLAN developer, and had reverse engineered FairPlay and written VLC's FairPlay support. It has been available in VideoLAN CVS since January 2004, but the first release to include FairPlay support is VLC 0.7.1 (released March 2, 2004).

2005
On March 18, 2005, Travis Watkins and Cody Brocious, along with Johansen, wrote PyMusique, a Python based program which allows the download of purchased files from the iTunes Music Store without Digital Rights Management (DRM) encryption. This was possible because Apple Computer's iTunes software adds the DRM to the music file after the music file is downloaded. On March 22, Apple released a patch for the iTunes Music Store blocking the use of his PyMusique program. The same day, an update to PyMusique was released, circumventing the new patch.

On June 26, 2005, Johansen created a modification of Google's new in-browser video player (which was based on the open source VLC media player) less than 24 hours after its release, to allow the user to play videos that are not hosted on Google's servers.

In late 2005, Håkon Wium Lie, the Norwegian CTO of Opera Software, co-creator of Cascading Style Sheets and long-time supporter of open source, named Johansen a "hero" in a net meeting arranged by one of Norway's biggest newspapers. On September 2, 2005, The Register published news that DVD Jon had defeated encryption in Microsoft's Windows Media Player by reverse engineering a proprietary algorithm that was ostensibly used to protect Windows Media Station NSC files from engineers sniffing for the files' source IP address, port or stream format. Johansen had also made a decoder available.

In September 2005, Johansen announced the release of SharpMusique 1.0, an alternative to the default iTunes program. The program allows Linux and Windows users to buy songs from the iTunes music store without copy protection. In 2005, Johansen worked for MP3tunes in San Diego as a software engineer. His first project was a new digital music product, code-named Oboe.

Sony BMG DRM rootkit

In November 2005, a Slashdot story claimed that Sony-BMGs Extended Copy Protection (XCP) DRM software includes code and comments (such as "copyright (c) Apple Computer, Inc. All Rights Reserved.") illegally copied from an iTunes DRM circumvention program by Johansen. A popular claim was that, using the criteria that RIAA uses in its copyright lawsuits, Johansen could sue for billions of dollars in damages.

2006
On January 8, 2006, Johansen revealed his intent to defeat the encryption of next-generation DVD encryption, Advanced Access Content System (AACS). On June 7, 2006, he announced that he had moved to San Francisco and was joining DoubleTwist Ventures. In October 2006, Johansen and DoubleTwist Ventures announced they had reverse engineered Apple Computer's DRM for iTunes, called FairPlay. Rather than allow people to strip the DRM, DoubleTwist would license the ability to apply FairPlay to media companies who wanted their music and videos to play on the iPod, without having to sign a distribution contract with Apple.

2007
In July 2007, Johansen managed to allow the iPhone to work as an iPod with WiFi, without AT&T activation.

2008
On February 2, 2008, Johansen launched doubleTwist, which allows customers to route around digital rights management in music files and convert files between various formats. The software converts digital music of any bitrate encoded with any popular codec into a format that can be played on any device.

2009 
In June, he managed to get an advertisement for his application doubleTwist on the wall of the Bay Area Rapid Transit exit  outside the San Francisco Apple Store, just days before the 2009 WWDC event. On June 9, it was reported that the advertisement was removed by BART for allegedly "being too dark" and not allowing enough light into the adjoining transit station. The advertisement was later redesigned and redeployed with a transparent background.

Awards 
 January 2000 - Karoline award, given to high-school students with excellent grades and noteworthy achievements in sports, arts or culture
 April 2002 - EFF Pioneer Award

References

External links

 Jon Johansen's blog
 Electronic Frontier Norway's link collection on the Jon Johansen case: Complete (Norwegian) version, English version (links only)
 DVD Jon releases program to bypass iTunes DRM
 Interview with DVD Jon, from slyck.com
 Jon Lech Johansen talks to DVDfuture
 Wired News: DVD Jon Lands Dream Job Stateside
Libbenga, Jan (January 2, 2004) – "DVD Jon wins again"

1983 births
Living people
Norwegian Internet celebrities
Modern cryptographers
Norwegian computer programmers
Norwegian expatriates in the United States
Norwegian people of Polish descent
People from Harstad